The 1902 United States House of Representatives elections in South Carolina were held on November 4, 1902 to select seven Representatives for two-year terms from the state of South Carolina.  Four incumbents were re-elected and the three open seats were retained by the Democrats.  The composition of the state delegation after the election was solely Democratic.

1st congressional district
Incumbent Democratic Congressman William Elliott of the 1st congressional district, in office since 1897, opted to run for the U.S. Senate instead of seeking re-election.  George Swinton Legaré defeated Thomas W. Bacot in the Democratic primary and Republican challenger Aaron P. Prioleau in the general election.

Democratic primary

General election results

|-
| 
| colspan=5 |Democratic hold
|-

2nd congressional district
Incumbent Democratic Congressman W. Jasper Talbert of the 2nd congressional district, in office since 1893, opted to run for Governor instead of seeking re-election.  George W. Croft won the Democratic primary and defeated Republican challenger W.S. Dixon in the general election.

Democratic primary

General election results

|-
| 
| colspan=5 |Democratic hold
|-

3rd congressional district
Incumbent Democratic Congressman Asbury Latimer of the 3rd congressional district, in office since 1893,  opted to run for the U.S. Senate instead of seeking re-election.  Wyatt Aiken won the Democratic primary and defeated Republican challenger John Scott in the general election.

Democratic primary

General election results

|-
| 
| colspan=5 |Democratic hold
|-

4th congressional district
Incumbent Democratic Congressman Joseph T. Johnson of the 4th congressional district, in office since 1901, defeated Stanyarne Wilson in the Democratic primary and Republican L.W.C. Blalock in the general election.

Democratic primary

General election results

|-
| 
| colspan=5 |Democratic hold
|-

5th congressional district
Incumbent Democratic Congressman David E. Finley of the 5th congressional district, in office since 1899, defeated T. Yancey Williams in the Democratic primary and Republican C.P.T. White in the general election.

Democratic primary

General election results

|-
| 
| colspan=5 |Democratic hold
|-

6th congressional district
Incumbent Democratic Congressman Robert B. Scarborough of the 6th congressional district, in office since 1901, was unopposed in his bid for re-election.

General election results

|-
| 
| colspan=5 |Democratic hold
|-

7th congressional district
Incumbent Democratic Congressman Asbury Francis Lever of the 7th congressional district, in office since 1901, defeated J.B. McLaughlin in the Democratic primary and Republican challenger Alexander D. Dantzler in the general election.

Democratic primary

General election results

|-
| 
| colspan=5 |Democratic hold
|-

See also
United States House of Representatives elections, 1902
South Carolina gubernatorial election, 1902
South Carolina's congressional districts

References

"Report of the Secretary of State to the General Assembly of South Carolina." Reports and Resolutions of the General Assembly of the State of South Carolina. Volume II. Columbia, SC: 1903, pp. 1372–1373.

United States House of Representatives
1902
South Carolina